Ormond may refer to:

People
Ormond (surname)
 Earl of Ormond (Ireland)
 Earl of Ormond (Scotland)
 Ormond Wilson (1907–1988), New Zealand politician

Places
Ireland
 Ormond (ancient Irish kingdom), in the province of Munster
 Two baronies in North Tipperary
 Ormond Upper
 Ormond Lower
 Ormonde Castle, an Irish castle, from 1315 home of the Butler family
 Birr Aerodrome, the Ormand flying club

Scotland
 Ormond Castle, a Scottish castle, home of the Douglas family

England
 Great Ormond Street Hospital, a children's hospital in London

United States
 Ormond Beach (California), a portion of the California coastline
 Ormond Beach, Florida, a city in Florida
 Ormond Beach Middle School, a middle school located in the city of Ormond Beach
 Ormond Beach Municipal Airport, An airport close to Ormond Beach
 Ormond Yacht Club, a yacht club of Ormond Beach, Florida
 Ormond-By-The-Sea, Florida, a city in Florida

 Ormond Plantation House, Historic plantation house in St. Charles, Parish, LA
 Ormond Memorial Art Museum, Art Museum in Ormond Beach, Florida
Australia
 Ormond College, a residential college of The University of Melbourne
 Ormond, Victoria, a suburb of Melbourne, Australia
 Ormond railway station, in the suburb
 Ormond Primary School, Ormond, Victoria
 Ormond Amateur Football Club

New Zealand
 Ormond, New Zealand, a small settlement inland from Gisborne

Others
 Ormond Pursuivant, Scottish officer of arms.
 Ormond's disease,  Retroperitoneal fibrosis named for Dr. John Kelso Ormond
 Ormond (novel), a book by Maria Edgeworth
 Ormond Hotel, at one time the largest wooden building in the world

 Ormond (steam automobile company), 1904–1905

 Ormond; or, the Secret Witness, a 1799 novel by Charles Brockden Brown
 Ormond Shops, American women's apparel retailer, 1933-1994

See also
 Ormonde (disambiguation)